The Valchitran Treasure is an early Thracian treasure.

Discovery 

It was discovered on 28 December 1924 by two brothers who were working in their vineyard near the village of Valchitran, 22 km southeast of Pleven, Bulgaria.

Description 

The hoard consists of 13 receptacles, different in form and size, and weighs in total 12.5 kg:
 two round platters
 five round domed pieces, two with central handles
 three cups with handles
 a jug with handle
 three leaf shaped vessels with handles
 a bowl with two handles (4.5 kg of gold)

The gold metal has a natural mixture of 9.7% silver.

The scientists dated the treasure back to 1300 BC, at the time of the Thracians.

It is now one of the most valuable possessions of the National Archaeological Museum in Sofia.

See also
History of Bulgaria
Panagyurishte Treasure
Rogozen Treasure
Lukovit Treasure
Borovo Treasure

Notes

Bibliography 

 
 
 

 via- Met Publications

External links

The Valchitran Gold treasure 
Bulgaria Travel - image

1924 archaeological discoveries
Treasure troves in Bulgaria
History of Pleven Province
Gold objects